SK may refer to:

Businesses and organizations
 SK Foods, an American agribusiness company
 SK Hand Tools, an American tool manufacturer
 Sangguniang Kabataan, Philippines youth councils
 SK Group, South Korean conglomerate
 Scandinavian Airlines (IATA code SK)
 Silicon Knights, a Canadian video game developer

Places

Slovakia
 Slovakia (ISO country code)
 ISO 3166-2:SK, codes for the regions of Slovakia
 .sk, the internet country code top-level domain for Slovakia
 Slovak koruna, a former currency of Slovakia
 Slovak language (ISO 639-1 language code "sk")

Other places
 sk. sokak, Turkish postal abbreviation
South Korea, an Asian country
Saskatchewan, a Canadian province by postal abbreviation
Sikkim, a state in India (ISO 3166 code)
Svidník,  Slovakia, vehicle plates
Sisak, vehicle plate for city in Croatia
South Kingstown, Rhode Island, a United States town

Science and technology
 sk (unit) (Skot), an old and deprecated unit of measurement for dark luminance
 SK (people mover), a vehicle
Silent key, an amateur radio operator who has died
 "Stop keying", a prosign used in Morse code
 Super-Kamiokande, a Japanese neutrino detector

Biology 

 SK channel, small conductance calcium-activated potassium channels, a family of ion channels

Medicine 

 Solar keratosis or senile keratosis (these are synonyms)
Streptokinase, a bacterial enzyme used in the treatment of blood clots

Sport 

 SK Gaming, an electronic sports team

Other uses
Regulation S-K, regarding financial statements in the United States
 Shakib Khan, Bangladeshi film actor, known by the initialism SK
Sekolah Kebangsaan, a type of school in Malaysia
Søren Kierkegaard, Danish philosopher and theologian
 Storekeeper, a naval rating in the United States Navy
 Shahram Kashani (SK), an Iranian-American singer
 Senran Kagura (SK), video game series
 SK radar, an American made air-search radar used during World War II